Erwin Lawrence Gehrke (April 25, 1898 –  June 8, 1966) was a professional football fullback, halfback, and quarterback in the first American Football League. In his one-season career he played for the Boston Bulldogs in 1926.

Prior to joining the AFL, Gehrke played college football at Harvard University in Boston, Massachusetts. While at Harvard, Erwin also played baseball for the school.

His parents, Hermann and Augusta Gerken, were German emigrants.

References

External links
Yale Nine Defeats Harvard 7-3

1898 births
1966 deaths
Players of American football from Cleveland
American football fullbacks
American football halfbacks
American football quarterbacks
Harvard Crimson baseball players
Harvard Crimson football players
Boston Bulldogs (AFL) players
American people of German descent